Roberto Carlos (born 1973) is Brazilian former footballer and manager.

Roberto Carlos may also refer to:

 Roberto Carlos (singer) (born 1941), Brazilian singer
 Helado Negro (born 1980), American singer, full name Roberto Carlos Lange
 Roberto Carlos (footballer, born 1971), Brazilian footballer
 Roberto Carlos (footballer, born 1982), Spanish footballer
 Roberto Carlos Abbondanzieri (born 1972), Argentine footballer
 Roberto Carlos Castro (born 1980), Mexican footballer
 Roberto Carlos Chacón (born 1999), Venezuelan footballer
 Roberto Carlos Cortés (born 1977), Colombian footballer
 Roberto Carlos Fernández (born 1999), Bolivian footballer
 Roberto Carlos Juárez (born 1984), Mexican footballer
 Roberto Carlos Leyva (born 1979), Mexican boxer
 Roberto Carlos Mansilla (born 1981), Spanish footballer
 Roberto Carlos Peña (born 1984), Colombian footballer
 Roberto Carlos Sosa (born 1975), Argentine footballer